This is a list of U.S. presidential electors from North Dakota, by year.

2020
Voted for Donald Trump and Mike Pence:
 Sandy J. Boehler (R) of Fargo (at-large elector).
 John Trandem (R) of Reiles Acres (at-large elector) - replaced Ray Holmberg
 Ray Holmberg (R) of Grand Forks (at-large elector) - recused himself due to covid-19 quarantine.
 Robert Wefeld (R) of Bismarck (at-large elector).

2016
Voted for Donald Trump and Mike Pence:
 Beverly Clayburgh (R) of Grand Forks (at-large elector).
 John M. Olson (R) (at-large elector)
 Duane O. Mutch (R) of Larimore (at-large elector).

2012
Voted for Mitt Romney and Paul Ryan:
 Layton Freborg (R) of Underwood (at-large elector)
 Mary Lee (R) of Bismarck (at-large elector).
 David Nething (R) of Jamestown (at-large elector).

2008
Voted for John McCain and Sarah Palin:
 Theresa Tokach (R) of Mandan (at-large elector who replaced Richard Elkin (R) of Bismarck)
 Susan Wefald (R) of Bismarck (at-large elector).
 Cleo Thompson (R) of Page (at-large elector).

2004
Betsy Dalrymple (R) of Casselton, wife of Lieutenant Governor Jack Dalrymple
Ben Clayburgh (R) of Grand Forks, former candidate for United States Senate
Jackie Williams (R) of Williston, former District One chair for the North Dakota Republican Party

2000
Rosemarie Myrdal (R) of Bismarck, Lieutenant Governor of North Dakota
Ed Schafer (R) of Bismarck, Governor of North Dakota
Bryce Streibel (R)

1996
Bob Peterson (R) of Bismarck, North Dakota State Auditor
Earl Strinden (R) of Grand Forks, former candidate for United States Senate and former House Majority Leader
Vernon E. Wagner (R), North Dakota House of Representatives member from 1963 to 1982, Speaker of the House 1979

1992
Frank Wenstrom (R), state legislator from District 45 and District 1
Sheila Schafer (R), wife of Harold Schafer, mother of then newly elected Governor of North Dakota Ed Schafer
Betty Rinde (R)

1988
Katherine Kilbourne (Kay) Burgum (R)
Harold Schafer (R) who filled the vacancy created by the absence of John E. Davis (R), former Governor of North Dakota
Brynhild Haugland (R), a veteran North Dakota House of Representatives member, served for 52 years from 1939 to 1990

1984
Robert McDaniel (R)
Harold Schafer (R), entrepreneur, father of future Governor of North Dakota Ed Schafer
Joe Steier (R)

1980
Edna V. Folden (R)
Robert F. Reimers (R), state legislator from District 23 and District 29
John E. Von Rueden (R)

1976
Norma Pullin (R)
Oscar Sorlie Jr. (R) North Dakota House of Representatives from 1949 to 1962, North Dakota Senate 1963 to 1972
Sophus Trom (R) North Dakota House of Representatives from 1959 to 1962

1972
Barbara L. King (R)
Mrs. Milton (Sybil) Kelly (R)
Don Hathaway (R)

1968
A. W. Luick (R)
Brooks Keogh(R)
Charles Harris (R)
Max Wishek (R)

1964
Daphna Nygaard of Jamestown (D)
John Hove of Fargo (D)
Harold R. Hanson of New England (D)
Richard Holmes of Guelph (D)

See also
 List of U.S. presidential electors

References

United States presidential electors
United States presidential elections in North Dakota
North Dakota